is a professional Japanese baseball player. He plays infielder for the Chiba Lotte Marines.

External links

 NPB.com

1993 births
Living people
Baseball people from Okayama Prefecture
Asia University (Japan) alumni
Japanese baseball players
Nippon Professional Baseball infielders
Chiba Lotte Marines players